Krista Tesreau (born January 10, 1964; St. Louis, Missouri) is an American actress.

Career
Tesreau is best known for her role as Melinda “Mindy” Lewis on the CBS soap opera Guiding Light, which she portrayed from 1983 to 1989. In 1987 Tesreau was nominated for a Daytime Emmy Award for Outstanding Ingenue for the role, and received a Soap Opera Digest Award nomination in 1988.

Tesreau also played Andie Klein on Santa Barbara from August 20, 1992 to January 15, 1993, and "whirling dervish" Tina Lord on One Life to Live from July 6, 1994 to January 24, 1997. Reappeared on Guiding Light as Mindy briefly in 2002, 2004, and again starting March 6, 2009.

References

External links

Krista’s Official Website

1964 births
Living people
Actresses from St. Louis
American television actresses
American soap opera actresses
21st-century American women